Adam Wexler is an American-Israeli musician, best known as the bassist for influential Jewish rock groups Diaspora Yeshiva Band and Reva L'Sheva.

Biography
Wexler grew up in Minneapolis, Minnesota and started playing at age five. He is a cousin of singer-songwriter Peter Himmelman.

In 1975, Wexler became one of the founding members of the Diaspora Yeshiva Band, along with Avraham Rosenblum, Ben Zion Solomon, Simcha Abramson, Ruby Harris, and Gedalia Goldstein. The group, which played rock and bluegrass with Jewish lyrics, was highly influential in Jewish music and released six albums before disbanding in 1983.

Wexler was an associate of Rabbi Shlomo Carlebach, performing on several albums in the 1980s and early 1990s. Shortly after Carlebach's death in 1994, Wexler and fellow Carlebach devotee Yehuda Katz co-formed the band Reva L'Sheva. Combining a Carlebach influence with a jam band rock sound, the band was a forebearer of the post-Carlebach Jewish rock scene, preceding bands like Moshav, Soulfarm, and Blue Fringe. The band released six studio albums before disbanding in 2004.

In 2005, Wexler released his debut solo album, A Million Voices.

Child molestation case
On December 23, 2004, Wexler was indicted and later jailed on charges he had sexually abused an eight-year-old girl in his neighborhood. The charges, most of which Wexler admitted to, included three instances of "rape, indecent acts, and indecent assaults" committed between 1994 and 1996.

Discography

Solo albums
A Million Voices (2005)

With Diaspora Yeshiva Band
 The Diaspora Yeshiva Band (1976)
 Melave Malka with the Diaspora Yeshiva Band (1977)
 At the Gate of Return (1978)
 Live From King David's Tomb (1980)
 Land of Our Fathers (1981)
 Diaspora Live on Mt. Zion (1982)
 Live at Carnegie Hall (1992)
 The Diaspora Collection (2000)

With Shlomo Carlebach
Shlomo Sings with the Children Of Israel (Hiney Anochi V'hayeladim) (1989)
The Gift of Shabbos (1995)
Open Your Hearts (Music Made From The Soul, Vol. 1) (1986 Recordings) (1997)
Holy Brothers and Sisters (Music Made From The Soul, Vol. 2) (1986 Recordings) (1997)

With Reva L'Sheva
Higia HaZman (1996)
Kumu (1998)
Etz Chaim Hee: Secrets (1999)
Avahat Chinam: One Love (2001)
10: Live (2004)
V'Sham Nashir (2005)

References

Jewish rock musicians
American emigrants to Israel
Israeli bass guitarists
Shlomo Carlebach
1956 births
Living people
Musicians from Minneapolis
Date of birth missing (living people)
Diaspora Yeshiva Band members
Reva L'Sheva members
Guitarists from Minnesota
American male guitarists
20th-century American guitarists
Male bass guitarists